Marina Anatolyevna Melnikova (born 5 February 1989) is a Russian tennis player.

She has won six singles and 15 doubles titles on the ITF Circuit. On 4 May 2015, Melnikova reached her best singles ranking of world No. 170. On 20 June 2016, she peaked at No. 80 in the doubles rankings.

Melnikova made her WTA Tour debut 2008 at Barcelona and also featured 2009 in the Rosmalen Open, both times in the doubles draw. She was a finalist at the ITF Delhi in doubles, alongside Elise Mertens.

Personal life and background
Melnikova is currently coached by Oleg Mannapov. Her father is Anatoliy, mother is Elena, and brother is Sergey. She started playing at age seven when introduced to the sport by her dad. Her favorite surfaces are hard and clay. After finishing school in 2008, she moved from Russia to Germany, and she speaks fluently English and German.

Grand Slam performance timeline

Singles

WTA career finals

Doubles: 1 (runner-up)

WTA 125 tournament finals

Doubles: 1 (runner-up)

ITF Circuit finals

Singles: 17 (7 titles, 10 runner–ups)

Doubles: 36 (15 titles, 21 runner–ups)

Notes

References

External links

 
 

1989 births
Living people
Russian expatriate sportspeople in Germany
Sportspeople from North Rhine-Westphalia
Sportspeople from Perm, Russia
Russian female tennis players